Santiago "Santi" Jiménez Luque (born 12 January 1993) is a Spanish footballer who plays as a left winger for Real Balompédica Linense.

Club career
Born in Málaga, Andalusia, Luque graduated from Real Betis' youth setup, after spells it out at CD 26 de Febrero and CD Puerto Malagueño. He made his debuts as a senior with the former's reserves in the 2011–12 campaign, in the Segunda División B.

In August 2012 Luque moved to CD San Roque de Lepe also in the third level. He appeared more regularly with the side, but moved to Tercera División club CD Ronda in the 2013 summer.

On 1 February 2014 Luque joined another reserve team, CD Tenerife B also in the fourth level. On 14 February 2015 he played his first match as a professional, coming on as a second half substitute for fellow youth graduate Víctor García in a 1–1 away draw against CD Mirandés in the Segunda División.

On 23 July 2015, Luque was loaned to Algeciras CF of the third tier. On 7 August of the following year, he moved to UD Melilla also in a temporary deal.

On 5 August 2017, Luque signed a two-year contract with fellow second-tier club Lorca FC, after cutting ties with the Canarians. Ten days later, however, he was loaned to third-tier club Recreativo de Huelva for one year.

On 18 January 2018, Luque's loan was cut short.

References

External links

Beticopedia profile 

Santi Luque at La Preferente

1993 births
Living people
Footballers from Málaga
Spanish footballers
Spanish expatriate footballers
Association football wingers
Segunda División players
Segunda División B players
Tercera División players
Betis Deportivo Balompié footballers
CD San Roque de Lepe footballers
CD Tenerife B players
CD Tenerife players
Algeciras CF footballers
UD Melilla footballers
Lorca FC players
Recreativo de Huelva players
Écija Balompié players
Club Guaraní players
Real Balompédica Linense footballers
Spanish expatriate sportspeople in Paraguay
Expatriate footballers in Paraguay